Roméo "Seka" Affessi (born February 19, 1984) is an Ivorian footballer who plays in the offensive midfield.

Career 
Seka previously played for RAEC Mons and K.S.K. Beveren in the Belgian First Division. He began his career with ASEC Mimosas.

References

External links

 Roméo Affessi Interview

1984 births
Living people
Ivorian footballers
R.A.E.C. Mons players
K.S.K. Beveren players

Association football midfielders